Wyndham Halt railway station served the village of Wyndham, in the historical county of Glamorgan, Wales, from 1942 to 1958 on the Ogmore Valley Railway.

History 
The station was opened on 10 August 1942 by the Great Western Railway. It served two nearby collieries at Wyndham and Penllwyngwent. It closed on 5 May 1958. The platform still exists, albeit in an overgrown state.

References

External links 

Disused railway stations in Bridgend County Borough
Former Great Western Railway stations
Railway stations in Great Britain opened in 1942
Railway stations in Great Britain closed in 1958
1942 establishments in Wales
1958 disestablishments in Wales